This discography lists the key British and notable international releases of The KLF and the other pseudonyms of Bill Drummond and Jimmy Cauty. It also details the other releases on their independent record label, KLF Communications, by KLF-spinoff Disco 2000 and Space (Cauty's solo work). In the United Kingdom—their home country—Drummond and Cauty released six albums and a wide array of 12 " singles on KLF Communications. In other territories their material was typically issued under licence by local labels.

Although the duo's early works as The Justified Ancients of Mu Mu (The JAMs) aroused media interest, with many singles being awarded "single of the week" by various music publications, Drummond and Cauty neither sought nor found mainstream chart success until the release of The Timelords' million-selling DIY release "Doctorin' the Tardis" in May 1988. The KLF's single "Kylie Said to Jason", from The White Room soundtrack, was designed for chart success, but failed to reach the UK Top 100.  However, The KLF achieved international chart success with the string of pop-house singles that began with "What Time Is Love? (Live at Trancentral)", and they became the internationally highest-selling singles band of 1991.

Note that this is a not a complete list; compilation appearances of otherwise available tracks, bootleg recordings, and certain very limited edition remix and promotional singles have been excluded.

Albums

Studio albums

Compilation albums

Singles

Remixes and production work
The following tracks were remixed by The KLF:

In 1989, as The Justified Ancients of Mu Mu, the duo produced the Moody Boys' single "First National Rapper" and its B-side, "Funky Zulu".

Compilation appearances
The following tracks and remixes were made available only on Various Artists compilation albums. Compilation appearances by tracks which were also released on an album or single are not included. Mixes for DJs and megamixes are also excluded.

Films

The KLF
All titles credited to The KLF and released on VHS video.

K Foundation
The following K Foundation films have all had public screenings, but have not been released on any home video format.

Books

Unreleased
The following KLF projects were announced but not released. Some of these, but by no means all, circulate as bootleg recordings/videos; some may not have been recorded at all.

Notes

References

Further reading
 "The KLF: Enigmatic dance duo" (feature and discography up to that time), Record Collector Magazine, April 1991.

External links

 
Discographies of British artists
Discography